Williamsport is a place name that may refer to the following places in the United States:
Williamsport, Arizona
Williamsport, Indiana
Williamsport, Maryland
Williamsport, Michigan
Williamsport, Ohio
Williamsport, Pennsylvania, the largest Williamsport in the United States
Williamsport Regional Airport
Williamsport, Tennessee
Williamsport, West Virginia

See also
Williamsport Township, Shawnee County, Kansas